John Fraser (born 2 March 1936) is a Scottish former footballer, who played primarily as an outside right for Hibernian (Hibs) in the late 1950s and early 1960s. After a brief spell with Stenhousemuir, Fraser returned to Hibs as a coach, a position he held for 10 years under three different managers.

Fraser signed for Hibs in 1954, but was initially a part-time player while he completed his national service. He had the unenviable task of covering for and eventually replacing Gordon Smith, who Fraser idolised. Fraser played in the 1958 Scottish Cup Final and some of Hibs' famous European nights in the early 1960s, including a friendly match win against Real Madrid and a Fairs Cup win against Barcelona.

After spending a few years as a player-coach in Hibs' reserve team, Fraser briefly played for Stenhousemuir, before returning to Hibs as a coach. Bob Shankly brought him back initially, and Willie MacFarlane then offered Fraser a full-time coaching position. Fraser continued in this position under Eddie Turnbull, as Hibs enjoyed one of the most successful periods in their history in the early 1970s.

References

Sources

External links
 

1936 births
Living people
Association football wingers
Scottish footballers
Stenhousemuir F.C. players
Hibernian F.C. players
Scottish Football League players
Hibernian F.C. non-playing staff
Footballers from Edinburgh